Tamara Vol. 2 is a 2018 teen comedy film directed by Alexandre Castagnetti. It is a sequel to the 2016 film Tamara.

Cast
 Héloïse Martin as Tamara
 Rayane Bensetti as Diego
 Noémie Chicheportiche as Sam
 Jimmy Labeeu as Wagner
 Idrissa Hanrot as James
 Manon Azem as Elodie
 Sylvie Testud as Amandine
 Blanche Gardin as Valérie
 Cyril Gueï as Chico
 Ina Castagnetti as Yoli
 Annie Cordy as Rose
 Karidja Touré as Naima
 Panayotis Pascot as Max
 Bruno Salomone as Philippe-André Trémolo

References

External links
 

2018 films
2018 comedy films
2010s high school films
2010s teen comedy films
Belgian teen comedy films
Body image in popular culture
Films based on Belgian comics
Films set in France
Films shot in France
French high school films
2010s French-language films
French sequel films
French teen comedy films
Live-action films based on comics
French-language Belgian films
2010s French films